The Pagua River is one of the longest rivers on the Caribbean island of Dominica.  It originates in the D'Leau Gommier area of the Central Forest Reserve, where it shares the same watershed as the Layou River.  It flows northeastward, forming the western boundary of the Carib Territory.  It empties into the Atlantic Ocean in Pagua Bay, on Dominica's east coast.

The village of Concord lies on the Pagua River.

See also
List of rivers of Dominica

References

External links

 Map of Dominica
  GEOnet Names Server
 Water Resources Assessment of Dominica, Antigua and Barbuda, and St. Kitts and Nevis

Rivers of Dominica